Carolina Miranda may refer to:

 Carolina A. Miranda, columnist for the Los Angeles Times
 Carolina Miranda (footballer) (born 1982), Spanish football midfielder
 Carolina Miranda (actress) (born 1989), Mexican television actress